William Harold "Hogi" Hogaboam (born May 9, 1949) is a Canadian former professional ice hockey centre. His career began in 1970–71 as a member of the Central Hockey League's Omaha Knights, as he played in 63 games, scoring 12 goals, 30 points, and 18 assists. The following year in Omaha he greatly improved his offensive output, scoring 30 goals, 82 points, and 52 assists.

In 1972–73, Hogaboam played two games in the National Hockey League (NHL) with the expansion Atlanta Flames, before being traded to the Detroit Red Wings for veteran Leon Rochefort at the end of November. He played four games for Detroit that season, but the majority of his season was played with the Virginia Wings of the American Hockey League (AHL). It was in 1973–74 that he had the opportunity to play more, appearing in 47 games for the Red Wings, scoring 18 goals and 23 assists for 41 points. It was that production which saw him inserted into Detroit's lineup for 60 games the following year, with little increase of production.

Late in the 1975–76 season, Hogaboam was traded to the Minnesota North Stars for Dennis Hextall. Hogaboam was named the team's captain the next year and scored 25 points. After another two years in the North Stars' organization, Hogaboam was sent back to the Red Wings, where most of his playing time was spent in the minors. In 1982–83, Hogaboam played his final pro season with the Adirondack Red Wings of the AHL.

Hogaboam was born in Swift Current, Saskatchewan. He now lives in Kelowna, British Columbia and works at the Kelowna Golf and Country Club.

Career statistics

External links

1949 births
Living people
Adirondack Red Wings players
Atlanta Flames players
Detroit Red Wings players
Ice hockey people from Saskatchewan
Minnesota North Stars players
Omaha Knights (CHL) players
People from Swift Current
Saskatoon Blades players
Swift Current Broncos players
Undrafted National Hockey League players
Virginia Wings players
Canadian ice hockey centres